Kamayani (Hindi : कामायनी) (1936) is a Hindi epic poem (Mahakavya) by Jaishankar Prasad (1889–1937). It is considered one of the greatest literary works written in modern times in Hindi literature. It also signifies the epitome of Chhayavadi school of Hindi poetry which gained popularity in the late 19th and early 20th centuries.

Theme
Kamayani depicts the interplay of human emotions, thoughts, and actions by taking mythological metaphors. Kamayani has personalities like Manu, Ida and Śraddhā who are found in the Vedas. The great deluge described in the poem has its origin in Satapatha Brahmana. Explaining his metaphorical presentation of Vedic characters, the poet said:

Ida was the sister of the gods, giving consciousness to the entire mankind. For this reason, there is an Ida Karma in the Yagnas. This erudition of Ida created a rift between Shraddha and Manu. Then with the progressive intelligence searching for unbridled pleasures, the impasse was inevitable. This story is so very ancient that metaphor has wonderfully mingled with history. Therefore Manu, Shraddha, and Ida while maintaining their historical importance may also express the symbolic import. Manu represents the mind with its faculties of the head and heart and these are again symbolized as Faith (Shraddha) and Intelligence (Ida) respectively. On this data is based the story of Kamayani.

Structure
The plot is based on the Vedic story where Manu, the man surviving after the deluge (Pralaya), is emotionless (Bhavanasunya). Manu starts getting involved in various emotions, thoughts, and actions. These are sequentially portrayed with Shraddha, Ida, Kilaat, and other characters playing their part, contributing in them. The chapters are named after these emotions, thoughts, or actions. Some people consider that the sequence of chapters denotes the change of personality in a man's life with age. Following is the sequence:

Adaptations
Tumul kolahal kalah me, an excerpt from the 12th canto 'Nirved' (निर्वेद) was set to tune by the music composer Jaidev and sung by Asha Bhosle. It was released by The Gramophone Company of India in 1971 under the title 'An Unforgettable Treat Asha Bhosle'.

In 1999, the Films Division produced a short biographical film on Jaishankar Prasad. The film depicted his literary works as a novelist, story writer, poet, and essay writer. A Kathak musical of some verses from Kamayani was the highlight of the film. It was choreographed by the famous exponent of Kathak Uma Dogra, who also portrayed the role of Shraddha in it. 

Doordarshan, the national broadcaster of India produced a six-part musical on Kamayani.

Shakuntala Shukla and Vyomesh Shukla adapted Kamayani into a musical play. It was produced under the banner of Roopvani, Varanasi.

Translations
Kamayani has been translated into various languages. There exists a number of English translations of the book. Other languages into which it has been translated include Nepali, Oriya, Punjabi, Sanskrit, and Tamil.  Some specific cantos of Kamayani have been translated into English and Russian as well.

{| class="wikitable" style="text-align: center;"
!Language
! Translator
! Title
! Publication Year
! Publisher
! Notes
|-
|Bengali
|Nachiketa Bhardwaj
|Kamayani
|1996
|Rabindra Bharti Society
|-
|rowspan="6"|English
|BL Sahney
|Kamayani
|1956 (Serialised), 1971 (Book)
|Yugbodh Prakashan
|Free verses
|-
|Jagat Bhardwaj
|Cupid-Maid
|1974
|Jagat Jagrit Kendra
|Rhymed verses
|-
|Jai Kishan Das Sadani
|Kamayani
|1975
|Rupa and Co.
|Free verses
|-
|Manohar Bandhopadyay
|Kamayani
|1978
|Ankur Publishing House
|Rhymed verses
|-
|Harichand Bansal
|Kamayani
|1987
|Saraswati House Educational Publishers
|Rhymed verses
|-
|Parmananda Sharma
|Kamayani
|
|National Publishing House
|Free verses
|-
|Nepali
|Dhundiraj Bhandari
|Kamayani
|
|Sahitya Akademi
|
|-
|Sanskrit
|Bhagwan Dutta Shastri 'Rakesh'''
|Kamayani
|1950s
|Jan Vani Printers and Publishers
|Preface by Rahul Sankrityayan
|-
|}

See also
 Shatapatha Brahmana
 Chhayavad
 Flood myth

References

External links
 
  (English translation)
 Kamayani at Kavita Kosh (in Hindi)

Further reading
 Kamayani of Jai Shankar Prasad - As I saw It and Understood It'' by Dr.Girish Bihari 1st Edition 2006, Published by Film Institute, Lucknow (U.P.) - INDIA

Hindi poetry
Epic poems in Hindi